Kurien Kunnumpuram S.J.  (8 July 1931 – 23 October 2018)  was a Roman Catholic, Indian Jesuit priest and well-known Christian theologian. A member of the academic staff of the Faculty of Theology at Jnana Deepa, Institute of Philosophy and Theology, Pune (India) (Emeritus), he contributed in the field of ecclesiology, particularly with regard to Vatican II.

He was the founder-publisher-editor of Jnanadeepa: Pune Journal of Religious Studies, from 1998 to 2010. He was also the founding editor of JDV's Encyclopedia of Indian Christian Theology, till 2009. He was the editor of AUC: Asian Journal of Religious Studies.

Life and career
Kunnumpuram was born on 8 July 1931 in Teekoy, Kerala, India. He entered the Society of Jesus in 1950, and was ordained a priest in March 1963.

Kunnumpuram studied at the University of Innsbruck, completing his Doctorate in Systematic Theology in 1968 on "Ways of Salvation". The following year, he began teaching theology at the Jnana Deepa, Institute of Philosophy and Theology (Jnana Deepa, Institute of Philosophy and Theology), in Pune, India. He became the faculty dean in 1974, a post he held until 1977.

In 1987, Kunnumpuram became Rector of Jnana Deepa, Institute of Philosophy and Theology, Pune, India. He left the role in 1993.

In January 1998, Kunnumpuram founded the Jnanadeepa: Pune Journal of Religious Studies and acted as the journal's editor and publisher. Four years later, in 2002, he started editing AUC: Asian Journal for Religious Studies.

Kunnumpuram's 80th birthday was celebrated at the Papal Seminary in Pune with a mass and felicitation hosted by Rt Rev Thomas Dabre, Bishop of Pune.

Later life and death 
In 2013, Kunnumpuram returned to the Jesuit Province of Kozhikode in Kerala. On 17 November 2017, at the age of 86, he suffered a minor stroke. He suffered a blood clot to the brain on 25 September 2018, and went into a coma. He died on 23 October 2018 at Nirmala Hospital in Kozhikode, Kerala, India.

Bibliography

Books Authored by Kunnumpuram 
 Kunnumpuram, K. (2018) Freedom and Joy: Reflections on the Essential Characteristics of Christian Life Today.  New Delhi: Christian World Imprints.
 Kunnumpuram, K. (2014) Give More than You Take. Mumbai, St. Paul's.
 Kunnumpuram, K. (2012) Called to Serve. Mumbai, St. Paul's.
 Kunnumpuram, K. (2010) Life in Abundance. Mumbai, St. Paul's.
 Kunnumpuram, K. (2009) Towards the Fullness of Life: Reflections on the Daily Living of the Faith.  Mumbai: St Paul's.
 Kunnumpuram, K. (2007) The Indian Church of the Future. Mumbai: St Paul's.
 Kunnumpuram, K. (2005) Towards a New Humanity: Reflections on the Church's Mission in India Today.  Mumbai: St Paul's.
 Kunnumpuram, K., Fernando, L. (1993) Quest for an Indian Church: An Exploration of the Possibilities Opened up by Vatican II.  Anand, Gujarat, India: Gujarat Sahitya Prakash.
 Kunnumpuram, K. (1971) Ways of Salvation.  Mumbai: Papal Athenaeum.

Books Edited by Kunnumpuram 
 Kunnumpuram, K. (ed) (2016) The Vision of a New Church and a New Society: A Scholarly Assessment of Dr. Samuel Rayan's Contribution to Indian Christian Theology, New Delhi: Christian World Imprints.
 Kunnumpuram, K. (ed) (2013) Mission of the Church: Selected Writings of Samuel Rayan, S.J. Mumbai: St Pauls. (Vol II)
 Kunnumpuram, K. (ed) (2012) In Spirit and Truth: Selected Writings of Samuel Rayan, S.J. Mumbai: St Pauls. (Vol II)
 Kunnumpuram, K. (ed) (2012) Blood And Tears: Interdisciplinary Studies on Religion and Violence.  Mumbai: St Paul's.
 Kunnumpuram, K. (ed) (2010) Jesus: The Relevance of His Person and Message for Our Times: Selected Writings of Samuel Rayan, S.J. Mumbai: St Paul's. (Vol I)
 Kunnumpuram, K. (ed) (2008) Force, Fraud or Free Choice: Interdisciplinary Perspectives on Conversion. Mumbai: St Paul's.
 Kunnumpuram, K. (ed) (2007) World Peace: An Impossible Dream?, Mumbai: St Paul's.
 Kunnumpuram, K. (ed) (2007) Indian Church of the Future, Mumbai: St Paul's. Together with Rekha Chennattu.
 Kunnumpuram, K. (ed) (2006) The Eucharist and Life: Indian Christian Reflections on the Lord's Supper. Mumbai: St Paul's.
 Kunnumpuram, K. (ed) (2006) Shaping Tomorrow's Church: Formation of Priests and Religious for India. Mumbai: St Paul's.

Festschrifts for Kunnumpuram 
 Pandikattu, K., Rocha, R. (eds) (2003) Bend without Fear: Hopes and Possibilities for an Indian Church: Essays in Honour of Professor Kurien Kunnumpuram SJ. New Delhi: ISPCK.
 Rocha, R & Pandikattu, K (eds) (2002) Dreams and Visions: New Horizons for an Indian Church: Essays in Honour of Professor Kurien  Kunnumpuram SJ. Pune: Jnana Deepa, Institute of Philosophy and Theology.

References

External links 

Jnana Deepa, Institute of Philosophy and Theology, Pune, India.
Papal Seminary, Pune, India.
Kerala Jesuits, India.
The Journal Jnanadeepa that he founded
The Journal AUC that he edited for 12 years
His personal site

1931 births
2018 deaths
20th-century Indian Jesuits
20th-century Indian Roman Catholic theologians
Writers from Kottayam
Writers from Pune
Indian editors
20th-century Indian educational theorists
Christian clergy from Kottayam
21st-century Indian Roman Catholic theologians